James Poole Maunsell Pigot (31 January 1901 – 20 July 1980) was an Irish first-class cricketer.

Pigot was born at Dublin to Alice Maud Knox, and her husband, John Henry Pigot, who would serve as president of the Irish Cricket Union from 1925–1928. He studied at Trinity College, Dublin, where he was member of Dublin University Cricket Club. He made his debut in first-class cricket for Dublin University against Northamptonshire at Rushden on their 1924 tour of England. He toured England with the university the following year, playing a further first-class match against Northamptonshire at Northampton. He moved to British India shortly after, playing first-class cricket in January 1926 in the 1925–26 Madras Presidency for the Europeans against the Indians at Madras. He made two further first-class appearances for the Europeans against the same opponents in the 1928–29 Madras Presidency and 1929–30 Madras Presidency. Playing a total of five first-class matches, he scored 67 runs at an average of 8.37, with a highest score of 50. This score came against Northamptonshire in 1925. With his leg break googly bowling, he took 4 wickets at a bowling average of 46.00, with best innings figures of 3/71. Pigot was still living in British India during World War II. He was made an emergency commission in the British Indian Army in June 1942. Returning to Ireland at some point after the war, he died at Glenageary in July 1980. His brother, David Pigot, Sr., and nephew, David Pigot, Jr., also played first-class cricket. His great grandfather was the judge David Richard Pigot.

References

External links

1901 births
1980 deaths
Cricketers from Dublin (city)
Alumni of Trinity College Dublin
Irish cricketers
Dublin University cricketers
Europeans cricketers
Irish expatriates in India
Indian Army personnel of World War II
British Indian Army officers